The Premier League was the second tier of speedway in the United Kingdom (with the exception of the 1995 and 1996 seasons) and governed by The Speedway Control Bureau (SCB), in conjunction with the British Speedway Promoters' Association (BSPA). The Premier League was founded in 1995 when the two divisions of the British League were amalgamated. In 1997, the Elite League was created as a new top tier with the Premier League becoming the second tier. The league operated until 2016 when British speedway was restructured with the formation of the SGB Premiership and SGB Championship.

As of 2016, there were 13 teams competing in this tier of British Speedway, contesting 6 competitions for silverware. These competitions were the Premier League, Premier League Cup, Premier League Knockout Cup, Premier League Pairs, Premier League Fours and the Premier League Riders' Championship.

History
The Premier League was founded in 1995 by the amalgamation of the two divisions of the British League, becoming the single professional tier of speedway in the UK. In 1997, the Elite League was formed as a new top tier, with the Premier League becoming the second tier. In 2015, Edinburgh Monarchs became the first team to win back-to-back titles since it became the second tier in the sport. The league took a standard League format from its creation in 1995 until 2005. In 2006 & 2007, the play-offs were devised which the top 4 (8 in 2006) finishing teams in the League contested in a knock-out competition, with the winner of the play-offs crowned the Premier League Champions. From 2008 onwards, the play-offs remained, however the prize was changed. Instead, the team that finished top in the league would be crowned champions, and then the top 4 finishing teams would qualify for the play-offs. The winner of the competition would then go on to race against the bottom Elite League team in the promotion/relegation Battle. Since its inception, no Premier League team has been successful in gaining Promotion this way. There is no longer promotion to the Elite league.

The format was revised for the 2011 Season. All teams met each other once home and once away, with the League then splitting into two groups using a pre-set formula based on their relative standings at the cut-off point of 10 home/ten away matches to determine the remaining 12 (6 home/6 away) fixtures for each side. The League fixtures were expanded due to the Premier Trophy being defunct for the 2011 Season.

The Team that finished 1st in the League were crowned Premier League Champions, with the top 4 teams further competing in the Premier League play-offs.

In 2012 a pre-league League Cup tournament was contested, initially on a round robin basis by Northern and Southern mini-leagues, with the top two teams from each going on to contest semi-finals. The top six teams in the Premier League proper will contest the league title via play-offs, while the next six teams at the end of the league matches will contest another trophy via a similar system. The champions are now the winners of the play-offs.

Teams

Team building
At the start of each season, teams are built up to maximum points limit. The combined Calculated Match Average (CMA) of the seven riders declared in the team must not be higher than an agreed figure set at the  British Speedway Promoters' Association (BSPA) Annual General Meeting. The Current Combined CMA limit stands at 42.50 and has been this figure since the 2009 season.

Final Premier League 2016 teams

Former teams

Champions

* Although the Sheffield Tigers did not finish 2nd in the League, The Premier League play-offs in 2006 and 2007 decided the champions and runners up. In 2007, Sheffield Tigers finished 4th but got to the Final, eventually losing to the Rye House Rockets.

Premier League play-offs
The play-offs were founded in 2006 and are run as a Knock Out Competition. The play-offs are usually the last competition of the run during the Premier League season and are contested in October.

Format
The first format was the top 8 teams from the Premier league going through to the play-offs. The Eventual winner of the play-offs were then declared Premier League Champions with the other finalists being declared Runner-Up. In 2007, the format was changed to the top 4 contesting the play-offs to decide the League Champions.

Once again in 2008, the format was changed. This time the league winners were crowned Champions of the Premier League. Therefore, the play-offs were now to decide which team from the Top 4 would go on to contest the Bottom Elite League team in the promotion/relegation Battle. No Premier League team has yet been successful in the promotion/relegation battle.

In 2011 the play-off's weren't run, although they returned a year later in 2012 with Scunthorpe Scorpions victorious over the Somerset Rebels.

Winners

Premier League Knockout Cup

The Premier League KOC was founded in 1968 under the name British League Division Two KOC, however since the Premier League was formed as the 2nd tier of British Speedway in 1997, it has come to be known as the Premier League KOC. The Competition usually runs throughout the premier league season and the final usually takes place in October.

Premier Trophy

The Premier Trophy was first contested in 1999. The Competition is usually run before the Premier League starts in April and May. The finals are usually contested in June/July. The competition was dropped from the 2011 calendar due to the expansion of the Premier League fixtures.

Premier League Riders' Championship

Premier League pairs

The Premier League Pairs was first contested in 1975. It was first run as the Premier League pairs when the 2nd tier was renamed the Premier League. The competition is usually run the night before the British GP. The current location for the contest is at the Oak Tree Arena, the home of the Somerset Rebels.

Premier League fours

See also
List of United Kingdom Speedway League Champions

References

External links
british-speedway.co.uk – Official league tables

Speedway leagues
Speedway competitions in the United Kingdom